Destiny Calling may refer to:

 "Destiny Calling" (James song), 1998
 "Destiny Calling" (Melody Club song), 2006
 "Destiny Calling" (Gotham), a 2017 episode of Gotham